Deinner Alexander Quiñones Quiñones (born August 16, 1995), is a Colombian professional footballer who plays as a midfielder for América de Cali.

Career statistics

References

External links
Deinner Quiñones at Soccerway
Deinner Quiñones at Milenio: Santos Laguna 

1995 births
Living people
People from Tumaco
Santos Laguna footballers
Association football midfielders
Colombian footballers
Categoría Primera A players
Categoría Primera B players
Liga MX players
Universitario Popayán footballers
Deportes Quindío footballers
Deportes Tolima footballers
Jaguares de Córdoba footballers
Independiente Medellín footballers
Atlético Nacional footballers
América de Cali footballers
Colombian expatriate footballers
Expatriate footballers in Mexico
Sportspeople from Nariño Department